Norton Radstock is the name of a former parish council that covered the conurbation of Midsomer Norton, Radstock and Westfield, in the English ceremonial county of Somerset. Created in 1974 as a large civil parish, it was abolished in 2011 and replaced by three smaller parishes.

It had a population of 21,325 at the 2001 census. The term Norton Radstock is not recognised by local residents, nor does it appear on any road map. Besides the towns of Midsomer Norton and Radstock and the parish of Westfield, the parish encompassed the smaller settlements of Clandown, Haydon, Welton and Writhlington.

Norton Radstock was twinned with Ambarès-et-Lagrave in France from September 1982.

Governance
The parish was created in 1974 as a successor to the Norton-Radstock urban district which had been created in 1933 by the merger of Midsomer Norton and Radstock urban districts, along with part of Frome Rural District.  Under the Local Government Act 1972 it became a successor parish to the urban district.

Following a Governance Review in 2010, the council was replaced in 2011 by separate town councils for Midsomer Norton and Radstock, and a parish council for Westfield.

Norton Radstock was governed by the unitary authority of Bath and North East Somerset and by Norton Radstock Town Council, which elected 14 councillors across the four wards of Midsomer Norton North, Midsomer Norton Redfield, Radstock and Westfield. It was part of the North East Somerset constituency, which elects a Member of Parliament to the House of Commons.

References

Former civil parishes in Somerset
Somerset coalfield
Urban areas of England
Midsomer Norton
Radstock